The 6th Edward Jancarz Memorial was the 1998 version of the Edward Jancarz Memorial. It took place on 16 May in the Stal Gorzów Stadium in Gorzów Wielkopolski, Poland. The Memorial was won by Tomasz Gollob who beat Roman Jankowski, Leigh Adams and Ryan Sullivan in the final.

Heat details 
 16 May 1998 (Saturday)
 Best Time: 64.51 - Hans Nielsen in Heat 13
 Attendance:
 Referee: Marek Wojaczek

Heat after heat 
 (65,97) Gollob, Adams, Bajerski, Walasek
 (65,36) Sullivan, Rickardsson, Fajfer, Nizioł
 (65,59) Jankowski, Nielsen, Paluch, Walczak
 (65,84) Ermolenko, Gustafsson, Cegielski, Flis
 (66,14) Walczak, Gustafsson, Rickardsson, Bajerski
 (66,28) Nizioł, Gollob, Cegielski, Paluch (R/start)
 (65,74) Sullivan, Jankowski, Adams, Flis
 (66,05) Nielsen, Ermolenko, Fajfer, Walasek (F4)
 (66,29) Jankowski, Ermolenko, Bajerski, Nizioł
 (65,56) Gollob, Flis, Nielsen, Stenka, Rickardsson (-)
 (66,42) Adams, Cegielski, Fajfer, Walczak
 (64,80) Sullivan, Gustafsson, Walasek, Paluch
 (64,51) Nielsen, Cegielski, Sullivan, Bajerski
 (65,03) Gollob, Gustafsson, Jankowski, Fajfer
 (65,40) Adams, Ermolenko, Paluch, Stenka, Rickardsson (-)
 (66,78) Flis, Nizioł, Walasek, Walczak (X)
 (69,79) Flis, Fajfer, Bajerski, Paluch
 (69,77) Gollob, Ermolenko, Sullivan, Walczak
 (70,31) Adams, Nielsen, Nizioł, Gustafsson (R1)
 (70,71) Jankowski, Cegielski, Stenka, Rickardsson (-), Walasek (N)
 The Final (top four riders)
 (?) T.Gollob, R.Jankowski, Adams, Sullivan

See also 
 motorcycle speedway
 1998 in sports

References

External links 
 (Polish) Stal Gorzów Wlkp. official webside

Memorial
1998
Edward Jancarz Memorial